Eve Trakway are a supplier of temporary access systems. The firm is the principal trading subsidiary of Accession Group Limited, which in 2013 was acquired by Ashtead Group plc for cash of £28 million, and a £7 million earnout.

History
Eve Trakway originates from a division of J. L. Eve Construction, which built the wartime Chain Home radar transmitter masts.

Structure
It is based at Bramley Vale near Ault Hucknall, off the A617 in eastern Derbyshire.

Products
The firm provide temporary roads, bridges, footpaths, and crowd control barriers for use in transport and construction projects and outdoor events.

References

External links

Bolsover District
Companies based in Derbyshire
Road infrastructure in the United Kingdom
Pavements